Donington and Albrighton is a local nature reserve being a valuable site for wildlife and recreation in Shropshire, it has a historical reference as it is the site of St Cuthberts Well which was believed to hold powers to cure the blind.

Location 

This site is in Albrighton Village in Humphreston Brook Valley, in Shropshire, close to the Church. Travelling to the site can be done by train, car or bus, with a carpark for the reserve signposted by Donington Church. Postcode: WV7 3EP. Grid reference: SJ 809046.

Background 

This 5.4 hectare Nature reserve site in the villages of Donington and Albrighton is located precisely in the valley of the Humphreston Brook.

Wildlife 

St. Cuthbert's Meadow is the main part of the reserve, and is mostly used as a recreational area by the locals.
The St. Cuthbert's well is surrounded by older trees like Beech, Hazel, but most noticeably Old Yew. These mature trees make it an important area for nesting birds.
The Donington Pool itself is a valuable area for breeding wildfowl, some fishing is allowed on this pool but is done through the Royal British Legion.
At the far side of Donington Pool is a willow carr woodland area, with streams and marshes. This woodland is not open to the public due to conflicting issues with Health and Safety, but is still an important area for wildlife.

More than ninety different bird types have been found either in, or flying over the site, and 30 bird species are known to breed in this reserve.

History of the site 

Historically the margin marking the boundary between Donington and Albrighton is shown by the Humphreston Brook. John Talbot, a miller in the early 17th century, made Donington Pool by damming the brook at Rectory Road, in order to power his mill by providing a non-stop water supply.
However because of this damming he was fined by Donington, but not by Albrighton due to permission for the mill already being approved.

The original pool created was bigger but due to stages of Hydrosere Succession it is gradually shrinking and will eventually turn into marshland, and wet woodland.

The famous well of St. Cuthberts is believed to hold miraculous water that can cure the blind.

Art and the Local Nature Reserve 

The fishing pool in the LNR has been awarded £50,000 to be spent on improving access to the public and those with disabilities.

These improvements in Donington Pool, Albrighton, include new fishing pegs and an access platform to allow all visitors to get to the water's edge.

An art project funded by the arts council has recently occurred on this LNR site. 
This involved Richard Taylor, an artist who with the help of the local people designed the centre piece. This centre piece was placed in the pool, and is made up of copper sculptured fish, with open mouths that spray water.

To represent the wildflowers present on the site, metal and glass sculptures were placed in the meadow, and brass rubbings were used to include the history of St. Cuthberts well in the design.

As the area needs to be maintained, RAF Cosford Trainees were asked to help. This work involved repairing a pathway, and clearing vegetation.

Gallery

References

External links 
 http://www.dalnr.org/

Nature reserves in Shropshire